College of the Immaculate Conception (CIC; colloquially, "C.I.") is a private Diocesan Catholic school in Sumacab Este, Cabanatuan, Nueva Ecija.  It is considered the first Catholic College in Nueva Ecija.

CIC is the first school in the Nueva Ecija with the grade school at Level III Accreditation and the high school and college at Level II Accreditation from the Philippine Accrediting Association of Schools, Colleges and Universities (PAASCU) for its Arts & Sciences, Business Administration, Grade School and High School programs.

History
College of the Immaculate Conception was founded by Rev. Fr. Ruperto T. Rosario, Cabanatuan parish priest, in 1926 as San Nicolas Catholic School (Grade School). In 1936, the school was renamed Cabanatuan Institute by its then Director, Rev. Carlos S. Inquimboy. In the same year also, the Reverend Sisters of Paul de Chatres came and helped in the administration of the school for four years. To the Reverend Sisters are attributed the opening to the public secondary courses, and the establishment of a dormitory for girls.

In 1950, Right Rev. Msgr. Pacifico B. Araullo became the next head; and in 1962 the school was elevated to college status, and was thus renamed College of the Immaculate Conception or better known as CIC. Msgr. Araullo was CIC's Founder and first President. It was during his term that the school greatly progressed and became known in the city and province for being the first Catholic College in Nueva Ecija, In 1973, CIC was chosen as the Center for the Applied Nutrition Program and Teacher Training for Nueva Ecija. It had also served as testing centers for the selection of DOST and PSHS scholars. Msgr. Araullo served CIC until his death in 1980.

Gallery

References

External links
Official Website
Official Facebook page
Instructional Media Center

Universities and colleges in Nueva Ecija
Catholic universities and colleges in the Philippines
Education in Cabanatuan